Hanzala Shaheed Malik (born 26 November 1956) is a Scottish Labour Party politician. He was a Member of the Scottish Parliament (MSP) for the Glasgow region from 2011 until 2016.

Early life and career 
Born in Glasgow, Malik gained a BSc degree in Computing with Business Administration from the University of Paisley. Prior to working in politics, he worked in both the private and public sector including serving as a police special constable and member of the Territorial Army.

Political career 
Malik was a Glasgow City Councillor for the one-member ward of Hillhead from 1995 to 2007, then as one of four in the larger multi-member of the same name from 2007 to 2012. In his role as a councillor, Malik was a member of council committees which included Education, Development and Regeneration, Finance, Housing, Licensing, Policy and Resources.

Malik was elected as a Labour MSP for the Glasgow region in the 2011 Scottish Parliament election (he declined to vacate his council seat until elections the following year, despite a by-election already being arranged for the ward after the death of another councillor). He was eleventh on Labour's regional list at the election in May 2016 and was not re-elected. He was re-elected as a Glasgow City councillor, again for Hillhead, in May 2017.

Malik endorsed Anas Sarwar in the 2021 Scottish Labour leadership election.

Personal life 
Malik is mixed-race; his father was born in Pakistan and his mother was born in Scotland. He has been married for over thirty years and has two children and two grandchildren.

References

External links 
 
BBC 2011 election results: Glasgow region
Archived website

1956 births
Living people
Labour MSPs
Members of the Scottish Parliament 2011–2016
Councillors in Glasgow
Scottish Labour councillors
Scottish people of Pakistani descent
British politicians of Pakistani descent
Hillhead
Alumni of the University of the West of Scotland